Sanchez William Genia (born 17 January 1988) is a professional rugby union player, currently playing scrum-half for the Kintetsu Liners in Japan. He had previously played Super Rugby for the Queensland Reds (2007–2015) and Melbourne Rebels (2018–2019). He also had previously played for Stade Français in France's Top 14 from 2015 to 2017.

Born in Port Moresby, Papua New Guinea, he played for Australia at international level from 2009 to 2019. Genia made his test debut against New Zealand, and went on to earn 110 international caps. Former New Zealand scrum-half Justin Marshall said Genia was "best in the world for his position".

Family and early life
Genia was born in Port Moresby, Papua New Guinea. He was introduced to rugby union (after playing rugby league growing up in PNG) when he moved to Brisbane, Australia at the age of 12 for his secondary education at Brisbane Boys' College, boarding at the school from 2000 to 2005. Genia played rugby for the Australia 'A' Schoolboys team in 2005, and was part of the Australian Under 19 rugby team that won the IRB World Championship in 2006.

Genia's Papua New Guinean father, Kilroy Genia, is a former Cabinet Minister in the Papua New Guinean government. His Australian mother, Elizabeth Genia, was appointed assistant governor at the Bank of Papua New Guinea in 2011. His older brother, Frankie Genia, plays international rugby union for Papua New Guinea (Pukpuks).

Despite playing 110 tests for Australia and having lived in Australia since he was 12, Genia does not hold Australian citizenship, owing to him playing professional rugby union overseas and the legal requirement for applicants to not have been absent from the country for more than 12 months in total in the four-year period, including no more than 90 days in total in the 12-month period prior to application.

Rugby union career
Genia was recruited to the Queensland Reds from the GPS club at the end of 2006 before their tour to Japan and obtained his first state cap for the Reds playing against Japan.

2007–2010
Genia made his Super 14 debut for the Reds as a 19-year-old against the Hurricanes at Suncorp Stadium in Brisbane on 3 February 2007. He shared the scrum half position with starting halfback  for most of the season, appearing in 11 of 13 matches for the Reds during the season. Later in 2007, Genia played for the Ballymore Tornadoes in the Australian Rugby Championship, appearing in all 8 games played by the team for the year.

In 2008, Genia added a further seven Super Rugby Caps (although only one starting) for the Reds. He was selected as the first choice scrumhalf for the Australian Under 20 team for the 2008 IRB Junior World Cup in Wales.

Genia played in eight Super Rugby matches in 2009, half of which were starting appearances, and scored four tries during the tournament but missed Queensland's final two matches of the season due to an injured finger tendon.

Genia was selected in the Wallabies squad for the 2009 Tri Nations and made his test debut against the All Blacks at Eden Park in Auckland on 18 July 2009. He came off the bench in the first four matches before getting starting berths against the Springboks in Brisbane, and against the All Blacks in Wellington. Genia then started in all five Tests of Australia's Spring Tour of Japan and Europe, before staying on at the tour's end to help the Barbarians beat the All Blacks at Twickenham.

In 2010, Genia captained the Reds, after regular captain James Horwill suffered an injury in the second match of the season. At the end of the season Genia was voted by his teammates as the 2010 players' player of the year and he won the Pilecki Medal. He was also voted the fans' player of the year, winning the People's Choice award.

2011–present
Genia won the Pilecki Medal again in 2011, and was voted the Australian Super Rugby Player of the Year by Australian rugby writers. He became the 78th Test captain of the Wallabies when he led the side against the United States at the 2011 Rugby World Cup. He was one of two Australian nominees, alongside David Pocock, for the 2011 IRB Player of the Year award.

In April 2012, he signed a new three-year deal with the Reds after turning down a lucrative offer from the Force. In early September Genia suffered a knee injury in Australia's win over South Africa. Genia missed eight Tests in a row and didn't expect to return to domestic action until the Reds play the Bulls in Brisbane on 23 March 2013.

It was rumoured that Genia was leaving Australia after the 2015 Rugby World Cup, possibly going to the English Club Bath, but he left Australia at the start of the 2015-16 season to play for Stade Français.

On 15 August 2017, Genia signed with the Melbourne Rebels for the 2018 and 2019 Super Rugby seasons.

On 24 November 2018, Genia became just the 10th Wallaby and the second Wallabies halfback after George Gregan to play 100-Tests for Australia; playing against England at London's Twickenham Stadium.

On 12 July 2019, Genia announced his test rugby retirement stating that he will not play for the Wallabies after the 2019 Rugby World Cup having signed to play for Kintetsu Liners in Japan.

Super Rugby statistics

Outside rugby
Genia is an ambassador for The Kokoda Track Foundation.

Honours
Queensland Reds
Super Rugby: 2011
Super Rugby Centurion
Australia
Tri-Nations: 2011
The Rugby Championship: 2015
Wallabies Captain 2011-2013
Test Rugby Centurion

Reference list

External links

 

1988 births
Living people
Papua New Guinean rugby union players
Australia international rugby union players
Australian rugby union players
Australian rugby union captains
Queensland Reds players
Brisbane City (rugby union) players
Rugby union scrum-halves
Papua New Guinean emigrants to Australia
People educated at Brisbane Boys' College
People from the National Capital District (Papua New Guinea)
Rugby union players from Brisbane
Stade Français players
Australian expatriate rugby union players
Australian expatriate sportspeople in France
Expatriate rugby union players in France
Melbourne Rebels players
Expatriate rugby union players in Japan
Hanazono Kintetsu Liners players
Australian people of Papua New Guinean descent